The yellow-shouldered grassquit (Loxipasser anoxanthus) is a species of bird in the tanager family Thraupidae that is endemic to Jamaica. It is the only member of the genus Loxipasser.  Its natural habitats are subtropical or tropical moist lowland forest, subtropical or tropical moist montane forest, and heavily degraded former forest.

Taxonomy
The yellow-shouldered grassquit was formally described in 1847 by the English naturalist Philip Henry Gosse as the "Yellow-back finch" in his book The Birds of Jamaica. Gosse coined the binomial name Spermophila anoxantha. The species was moved to the genus Loxipasser by the naturalist Henry Bryant in 1866. The genus name combines the word Loxia introduced by Carl Linnaeus in 1758 for the crossbills with Passer introduced by Mathurin Jacques Brisson in 1760 for the sparrows. The specific epithet anoxanthus is formed from the Ancient Greek anō meaning "above" or "upperparts" with xanthos meaning "yellow". The yellow-shouldered grassquit is monotypic: no subspecies are recognised.

Although the yellow-shouldered grassquit was traditionally placed with the buntings and New World sparrows in the family Emberizidae, molecular phylogenetic studies have shown that this species is a member of the subfamily Coerebinae within the tanager family Thraupidae.

References

 Raffaele, Herbert; James Wiley, Orlando Garrido, Allan Keith & Janis Raffaele (2003) Birds of the West Indies, Christopher Helm, London.

External links
 Xeno-canto: audio recordings of the yellow-shouldered grassquit

yellow-shouldered grassquit
Endemic birds of Jamaica
Higher-level bird taxa restricted to the West Indies
yellow-shouldered grassquit
yellow-shouldered grassquit
Taxonomy articles created by Polbot